Rui Pedro da Rocha Fonte (born 23 April 1990) is a Portuguese professional footballer who plays as a forward or a right winger for F.C. Famalicão.

After signing for Arsenal as a 16-year-old, he only made one competitive appearance for the club before signing with Sporting, who loaned him several times for the duration of his contract, including at Espanyol, who acquired him permanently in 2011. He subsequently joined Benfica, where injury problems saw him feature sparingly until his release; with his next team, Braga, he notably won the 2016 Portuguese Cup.

All youth levels comprised, Fonte earned 69 caps for Portugal, scoring 26 goals.

Club career

Early years and Arsenal
Fonte was born in Lisbon, and joined Sporting CP's youth system at only nine. In 2006 he signed a three-year deal with Arsenal, with a clause stating he was to return to his previous club if the English did not extend the contract beyond the original period.

A regular member of Arsenal's reserves, Fonte made his debut for the first team in a friendly against Barnet in the 2008 pre-season. He made his competitive debut for the Gunners as a substitute for Carlos Vela in a League Cup match against Wigan Athletic on 11 November 2008, a 3–0 home win.

On 30 January 2009, Fonte joined Championship side Crystal Palace on a one-month loan, with his older brother José playing a big role in persuading club and player of each other's merits. He made his debut for his new team in a 0–1 home defeat to Blackpool on the following day, and his loan was subsequently extended until the end of the season; Palace were docked a point and fined £20,000 for fielding him in their final match, despite his loan having expired.

On 19 May 2009, it was announced that Arsenal had decided not to extend Fonte's three-year contract, and the player returned to Sporting. He spent the 2009–10 campaign on loan to Vitória de Setúbal, making his Primeira Liga debut on 17 August in a 0–0 home draw against Vitória de Guimarães (one minute played) and appearing sparingly during the campaign as they barely escaped relegation.

Espanyol
Fonte played 2010–11 on loan to RCD Espanyol, in Spain. He spent the vast majority of his spell with the reserves, his first La Liga appearances consisting of one minute in a 1–0 home victory over Sporting de Gijón on 5 December 2010, and ten in a 0–1 loss to Real Madrid also at the Estadi Cornellà-El Prat two months later.

On 14 July 2011, Fonte signed permanently for two years. On 17 January of the following year he scored his first official goal for the Pericos, in a 3–2 home defeat of CD Mirandés in the quarter-finals of the Copa del Rey; he repeated the feat in the second leg, albeit in a 2–1 and 4–4 aggregate defeat. In between, he scored his first goal in the league, closing the 3–0 home win over Granada CF.

Benfica
Fonte terminated his contract with Espanyol on 29 January 2013 and, on the next day, signed with S.L. Benfica on a five-and-a-half-year deal. He was initially assigned to the B side in the Segunda Liga, suffering a knee injury in his debut against C.F. União and being sidelined for the rest of the campaign.

In January 2015, Jorge Jesus confirmed that Fonte was promoted to the first team after the loan of Nélson Oliveira. His first competitive appearance took place on the 14th, as he played the first half of the 4–0 home win against F.C. Arouca in the third round of the Taça da Liga.

On 2 February 2015, Fonte, at the time top scorer for Benfica B with 17 goals in 21 matches, was loaned to C.F. Os Belenenses until the end of the season. For 2015–16, he moved to S.C. Braga also on loan.

Braga
On 16 December 2015, after having replaced Wilson Eduardo for the last 11 minutes of regulation time, Fonte scored the 4–3 winner for the hosts against Sporting, helping oust his former club from the Taça de Portugal. The following 22 May, after being injured for nearly three months, he started in the final of the domestic cup, netting in a 2–2 draw against FC Porto (4–2 penalty shootout win).

Fonte agreed to a permanent three-year contract with Braga on 1 September 2016. He scored 11 goals during the campaign (15 overall), helping to a fifth-place finish.

Fulham
On 17 August 2017, Fonte transferred to Championship club Fulham after signing a three-year contract. He scored in his second league appearance, a 2–0 away victory over Ipswich Town.

Fonte joined Lille OSC from France on 31 August 2018 on a season-long loan, reuniting with his older brother José Fonte. His only goal for the eventual Ligue 1 runners-up came on 28 April 2019, in a 5–0 home defeat of Nîmes Olympique.

Return to Braga
Fonte returned to his homeland and Braga on 21 August 2019, signing a three-year deal. He spent the better part of the 2020–21 season on the sidelines, due to a cruciate ligament injury.

Estoril
On 31 August 2021, Fonte signed a one-year contract with a plus-one option with G.D. Estoril Praia.

International career
Fonte made his debut for the Portugal under-21s against Spain on 18 November 2008, scoring the first goal in a 4–1 victory. The following summer, he was part of the team that took silver in the Lusofonia Games, scoring a penalty in a 4–1 win over Angola on the final day. 

On 31 March 2015, Fonte was called up to the full side for the first time, for a friendly with Cape Verde, remaining on the bench in the 0–2 defeat in Estoril.

Personal life
Fonte's older brother, José, is also a footballer – a defender, he played most of his professional career in England, and the two were teammates at Sporting (youth), Crystal Palace and Lille.

Their father, Artur, played 12 seasons in the Portuguese top division.

Club statistics

Honours
Benfica
Taça da Liga: 2014–15

Braga
Taça de Portugal: 2015–16, 2020–21
Taça da Liga: 2019–20

Fulham
EFL Championship play-offs: 2018

Portugal U21
Lusofonia Games silver medal: 2009

References

External links

1990 births
Living people
Portuguese footballers
Footballers from Lisbon
Association football wingers
Association football forwards
Primeira Liga players
Liga Portugal 2 players
Sporting CP footballers
Vitória F.C. players
S.L. Benfica footballers
S.L. Benfica B players
C.F. Os Belenenses players
S.C. Braga players
G.D. Estoril Praia players
F.C. Famalicão players
English Football League players
Arsenal F.C. players
Crystal Palace F.C. players
Fulham F.C. players
La Liga players
Tercera División players
RCD Espanyol B footballers
RCD Espanyol footballers
Ligue 1 players
Lille OSC players
Portugal youth international footballers
Portugal under-21 international footballers
Portuguese expatriate footballers
Expatriate footballers in England
Expatriate footballers in Spain
Expatriate footballers in France
Portuguese expatriate sportspeople in England
Portuguese expatriate sportspeople in Spain
Portuguese expatriate sportspeople in France